The 2014 season was IFK Göteborg's 109th in existence, their 82nd season in Allsvenskan and their 38th consecutive season in the league. They competed in Allsvenskan where they finished second, Svenska Cupen where they were knocked out in the quarter-finals and the UEFA Europa League where they were knocked out in the third qualifying round. IFK Göteborg also participated in one competition in which the club continued playing in for the 2015 season, 2014–15 Svenska Cupen. The season began with the group stage of Svenska Cupen on 1 March, league play started on 30 March and lasted until 1 November. A new captain was announced since former captain Tobias Hysén left the squad. Vice captain Mattias Bjärsmyr took over the captaincy.

Summary

Allsvenskan

Svenska Cupen
IFK Göteborg qualified for the group stage of the 2013–14 Svenska Cupen in the 2013 season by beating Lunds BK 4–0 on 22 August 2013. The club was seeded second in the group stage draw after finishing second in the 2013 Allsvenskan. The groups were drawn on 13 November 2013 and IFK Göteborg were drawn against Superettan teams GIF Sundsvall and IFK Värnamo and Division 2 team Hudiksvalls FF. The group stage is being played between 1 and 15 March 2014 before the start of the league season.

The first match was a home fixture against IFK Värnamo at Valhalla IP on 1 March 2014, IFK Göteborg won the match 2–0. The second match was an away fixture against Hudiksvalls FF on 8 March 2014, IFK Göteborg won the match 10–0 after five goals by Robin Söder. The win is together with the club's 10–0 victory against Karlskrona BK in 1941 and 11–1 victory against Åsebro IF in 1997 the biggest victory in Svenska Cupen for IFK Göteborg.

The third and final match was a home fixture against GIF Sundsvall on 15 March 2014 at Ullevi which IFK Göteborg won 4–2. IFK Göteborg won the group and advanced to the quarter-finals where they faced Superettan club IK Sirius. The quarter-finals were drawn on 17 March 2014, the club was seeded in the draw after finishing as one of the four best group winners. The quarter-final was played at home on 23 March 2014, IFK Göteborg lost the match 1–0 and was knocked out.

The draw for the second round of the 2014–15 Svenska Cupen was made on 7 August. IFK Göteborg faced Division 3 side Assyriska Turabdin IK. The match was played away in Jönköping on 20 August and IFK Göteborg won 5–0 and progressed to the group stage to be held in March 2015.

UEFA Europa League
IFK Göteborg qualified for the 2014–15 UEFA Europa League by merit of finishing third in the 2013 Allsvenskan. The club entered the competition in the first round of qualification. The draw for the first and second qualifying rounds was held on 23 June, IFK Göteborg was seeded in both rounds in the draw. The club was drawn against the 2013–14 Luxembourgian runners-up Fola Esch in the first qualifying round. This was the fifth time that IFK Göteborg faced Luxembourgian opposition in European competition, and the first time since 2005. The first leg of the fixture was played at home on 3 July and ended in a 0–0 draw after a game of few chances from either side. The away fixture at Stade Josy Barthel in Luxembourg City was played on 10 July and ended with a 2–0 win for IFK Göteborg, thus taking them through to the second qualifying round with 2–0 on aggregate.

IFK Göteborg faced 2013–14 Hungarian runners-up Győri in the second qualifying round. The first leg was played at the ETO Park in Győr on 17 July and ended in a 3–0 victory for IFK Göteborg. The second leg was played on 24 July at home and ended with a 1–0 defeat for IFK Göteborg. The tie ended in a 3–1 win with IFK Göteborg advancing to the third qualifying round. This was the third time IFK Göteborg face a club from the Hungary in European competition and the first time since 2005.

IFK Göteborg faced 2013–14 Portuguese cup runners-up Rio Ave in the third qualifying round, IFK Göteborg were unseeded in the draw held on 18 July. The first leg was played at home on 31 July and ended in a 1–0 defeat for IFK Göteborg. The second leg was played on 7 August at Estádio do Rio Ave in Vila do Conde and ended with a 0–0 draw, which confirmed the aggregate score to 1–0 in favour of Rio Ave. This was the second time IFK Göteborg face a club from the Portugal in European competition and the first time since 1996.

Key events
 21 October 2013: Forward Hannes Stiller leaves the club. On 28 November he joined Superettan club Ljungskile SK.
 28 October 2013: Defender Kjetil Wæhler signs a new one-year contract, keeping him at the club until the end of the season.
 31 October 2013: Midfielder Martin Smedberg-Dalence joins the club on a four-year contract, transferring from IFK Norrköping.
 8 November 2013: Midfielder Pontus Farnerud leaves the club and retires.
 12 November 2013: Forward Sebastian Ohlsson leaves the club. On 12 December he joined Division 1 club and rival Örgryte IS.
 14 November 2013: Chairman Bertil Rignäs announces his resignation from the club.
 15 November 2013: Defender Logi Valgarðsson leaves the club, transferring to Sogndal IL.
 27 November 2013: Defender Erik Lund signs a new three-months contract, keeping him at the club until 31 March.
 4 December 2013: Midfielder Hampus Zackrisson is promoted to the first-team squad, signing a half-year contract to keep him at the club until 30 June.
 26 December 2013: Forward Pär Ericsson leaves the club, transferring to Mons.
 31 December 2013: Defender Mikael Dyrestam leaves the club. On 25 March he joined Aalesunds FK.
 3 January 2014: Forward and captain Tobias Hysén leaves the club, transferring to Shanghai Dongya.
 13 January 2014: Defender Mattias Bjärsmyr is chosen as the club's new captain.
 16 February 2014: Forward Hannes Stiller is selected as 2013 Archangel of the Year, an annual price given by the Supporterklubben Änglarna to a player who has shown a great loyalty to IFK Göteborg.
 17 February 2014: Director of sports Håkan Mild announces his resignation from the club.
 25 February 2014: Forward Gustav Engvall is promoted to the first-team squad, signing a four-year contract to keep him at the club until the end of the 2017 season.
 4 March 2014: Midfielder May Mahlangu joins the club on a one-year contract, transferring from Helsingborgs IF.
 6 March 2014: Karl Jartun is selected as new chairman at the annual meeting.
 8 March 2014: IFK Göteborg beats Division 2 team Hudiksvalls FF with 10–0 in Svenska Cupen which tangent the biggest win in Svenska Cupen for the club.
 12 March 2014: Forward Malick Mané joins the club on a four-year contract, transferring from Sogndal IL.
 13 March 2014: Head coach Mikael Stahre and assistant coach Magnus Edlund signs a new one-year contract, keeping them at the club until the end of the 2015 season.
 23 March 2014: Midfielder Gustav Svensson joins the club on a four-year contract, transferring from Tavriya Simferopol. 
 24 March 2014: Defender Erik Lund leaves the club, transferring to Varbergs BoIS.
 26 March 2014: The club announces the appointment of Mats Gren as the new director of sports.
 27 March 2014: Midfielder Nordin Gerzić leaves the club on loan to Örebro SK until 1 August 2014.
 28 March 2014: Defender Jonathan Azulay leaves the club on loan to Östersunds FK until 15 July 2014.
 6 June 2014: Midfielder Hampus Zackrisson signs a new half-year contract, keeping him at the club until the end of the season.
 30 June 2014: Defender Patrick Dyrestam is promoted to the first-team squad, signing a three and a half-year contract to keep him at the club until the end of the 2017 season.
 2 July 2014: Defender Jonathan Azulay extends his loan agreement with Östersunds FK so it covers the rest of the season.
 7 July 2014: Midfielder Nordin Gerzić extends his loan agreement with Örebro SK so it covers the rest of the season.
 15 July 2014: Midfielder Darijan Bojanić leaves the club, transferring to Helsingborgs IF.
 23 July 2014: Forward Malick Mané leaves the club on loan to Central Coast Mariners for the duration of the 2014–15 season.
 6 August 2014: Goalkeeper Mattias Hugosson joins the club on a half-year contract. 
 9 August 2014: Midfielder Søren Rieks joins the club on a three and a half-year contract, transferring from NEC. 
 11 August 2014: Forward Kenneth Zohore joins the club on a loan contract for the rest of the season, transferring from Fiorentina. Midfielder Daniel Sobralense leaves the club on loan to Örebro SK  for the duration of the season. Midfielder Diego Calvo joins the club on a loan contract for the rest of the season, transferring from Vålerenga.
 13 August 2014: Forward Sam Larsson leaves the club, transferring to Heerenveen.
 22 August 2014: Forward Robin Söder leaves the club, transferring to Esbjerg fB.
 30 September 2014: Defender Emil Salomonsson signs a new four-year contract, keeping him at the club until the end of the 2018 season.
 6 November 2014: Forward Gustav Engvall is selected as Allsvenskan newcomer of the year.

Players

Squad

Youth players with first-team appearances 
Youth players who played a competitive match for the club in 2014.

Players in/out

In

Out

Squad statistics

Appearances and goals

Disciplinary record

Club

Coaching staff

Other information

Competitions

Overall

Allsvenskan

League table

Results summary

Results by round

Matches
Kickoff times are in UTC+2 unless stated otherwise.

Svenska Cupen

2013–14
The tournament continued from the 2013 season.

Kickoff times are in UTC+1.

Group stage

Knockout stage

2014–15
The tournament continued into the 2015 season.

Qualification stage

UEFA Europa League

Kickoff times are in UTC+2 unless stated otherwise.

Qualifying phase and play-off round

First qualifying round

Second qualifying round

Third qualifying round

Non competitive

Pre-season
Kickoff times are in UTC+1.

Mid-season
Kickoff times are in UTC+2.

References

IFK Göteborg seasons
IFK Goteborg season